Aphumon, also Aphum or Aphoum, was a Sasanian city fortress and the main fortification in the district of Arzanene in Armenia. It functioned as a frontier stronghold and was the site of various battles during the Roman-Persian wars.

References

History of Batman Province
Western Armenia
Sassanian fortifications
Former populated places in Asia
Roman–Persian Wars